Harpur is a village in Gopalganj district in the Indian state of Bihar.

Demographics
As of 2011 India census, Harpur had a population of 1373 in 296 households. Males constitute 52.58% of the population and females 47.41%. Harpur has an average literacy rate of 48.87%, lower than the national average of 74%: male literacy is 62.59%, and female literacy is 37.4%. In Harpur, 15.87% of the population is under 6 years of age.

References

Villages in Gopalganj district, India